The Petite Rivière Pikauba is a tributary of the Pikauba River, flowing in the province of Quebec, in Canada, in the administrative regions of:
 Capitale-Nationale: in the unorganized territory of Lac-Pikauba, in the Charlevoix Regional County Municipality;
 Saguenay–Lac-Saint-Jean: in the unorganized territory of Lac-Ministuk, in the Le Fjord-du-Saguenay Regional County Municipality.

The Petite rivière Pikauba flows entirely into the Laurentides Wildlife Reserve. The valley of the Petite rivière Pikauba is mainly accessible thanks to the route 169 and the route 175 (connecting Quebec and Chicoutimi). Other secondary forest roads have been developed in the sector for the needs of forestry and recreational tourism activities.

Forestry developed in the sector at the end of the 19th century, thus generating the development of hunting and fishing activities.

The surface of the Petite rivière Pikauba is usually frozen from the end of November to the beginning of April, however the safe circulation on the ice is generally made from mid-December to the end of March.

Geography 
The Petite Rivière Pikauba rises at the mouth of Lac Desjardins. This lake is located in the central part of the Laurentides Wildlife Reserve. The mouth of Lac Desjardins is located at:
  west of the course of the Cyriac River;
  north-west of Pikauba Lake;
  south-east of the course of the Pikauba River;
  south-east of the junction of roads route 175 and route 169;
  south-east of the confluence of the small Pikauba river and the Kenogami Lake.

Upper course of the Petite rivière Pikauba (segment of )

  to the south, then crossing Lake Lanctôt west on its full length, to its mouth;
  south-west to Petit lac Beloeil, then south-east in particular by crossing Lake Beloeil over its full length;
  to the southwest, up to a bend in the river, corresponding to the outlet (coming from the southeast) from Lac Fortier and Lac Decoigne;
  towards the northwest by collecting the outlet (coming from the north) from Lake Fitou, up to the outlet (coming from the north) from Lake Dumais;

Intermediate course of the Petite rivière Pikauba (segment of )

  to the northwest in a deep valley crossing the route 175, to the outlet of Lac Tourangeau (coming from the east);
  towards the north-west in a deep valley by winding up to a stream (coming from the south);
  towards the northwest by winding in a deep valley to the Jean-Baptiste stream (coming from the southwest);

Lower course of the Petite rivière Pikauba (segment of )

  northwesterly, to In stream (coming from the east) which drains Lac Lévesque;
  north-west to the outlet (coming from the south-west) of Lake Ondée;
  north-west, to the outlet (coming from the east) of lakes Albert and Paul;
  towards the northwest by forming four loops towards the northeast, up to Le Grand Ruisseau (coming from the southeast);
  towards the northwest crossing several rapids, to its mouth.

This confluence of the small Pikauba River is located at:
  south-west of the course of the Jean-Boivin River;
  south-east of a curve of the course of the Rivière aux Écorces;
  north-east of route 169;
  south-west of route 175;
  south of Kenogami Lake;
  south-west of the barrage de Portage-des-Roches;
  south-west of the confluence of the Chicoutimi River and the Saguenay River.

Toponymy 
The toponym "Petite rivière Pikauba" was formalized on January 8, 1981, at the Place Names Bank of the Commission de toponymie du Québec.

References

Appendices

Related articles 
 Charlevoix Regional County Municipality
 Le Fjord-du-Saguenay Regional County Municipality
 Laurentides Wildlife Reserve
 Lac-Pikauba, a TNO
 Lac-Ministuk, a TNO
  Talbot Lake, a body of water
 Saguenay River, a stream
 Chicoutimi River, a stream
 Kenogami River, a body of water
 Pikauba River, a stream
 List of rivers of Quebec

Rivers of Saguenay–Lac-Saint-Jean
Le Fjord-du-Saguenay Regional County Municipality
Rivers of Capitale-Nationale
Charlevoix Regional County Municipality
Laurentides Wildlife Reserve